Lat Mosque (IAST: Lāṭ Masjid, literally "Pillar Mosque") is a mosque in Dhar town of Madhya Pradesh, India. Named after the Iron pillar of Dhar (called "lāṭ" in Hindi), it is also known as Lat ki masjid, Ladh Masjid, Lath Masjid, or Jami Masjid of Dhar.

History 

The mosque was built in 1405 CE by Dilawar Khan, the first Sultan of Malwa. Spolia from Hindu and Jain temples were used in its construction.

The mosque is named after a now-fragmented iron pillar (called lat in Hindi), which is located in its compound.

Architecture 

The pillars and carved brackets from the former temples can be seen in the colonnade of the mosque's inner courtyard. Hindu and Jain-style carvings can be seen on these pillars. One of the two gates of the mosque is also of Jain style. The mihrabs and minbar of the mosque were designed by the Muslims.

References

Bibliography 
 
 

Dhar
Mosques in Madhya Pradesh
15th-century mosques
Religious buildings and structures converted into mosques